San Policarpo may refer to :

 Saint Polycarp

Places and jurisdictions
 San Policarpo all'Acquedotto Claudio, titular and parochial church in Rome, for a cardinal-priest 
 San Policarpo, Eastern Samar